The EMI TG12345 was a mixing console designed by EMI for their Abbey Road Studios, which was used to mix several influential albums, including The Beatles' Abbey Road and Pink Floyd's The Dark Side of the Moon.

Overview
The TG12345 was installed in Abbey Road Studio Two in late 1968, making it possible for the studio to double the number of tracks it could record simultaneously, from four to eight. The mixer had twenty-four microphone inputs and eight tape outputs, a significant increase over the eight microphone inputs and four tape outputs of the REDD .51 mixing console that it replaced. This also enabled the studio to replace its four-track Studer J37 multitrack tape recorder with the eight-track 3M M23.

The TG12345 was Abbey Road Studios' first solid state mixing console and, unlike its vacuum tube-based predecessors, it featured a compressor as well as equalization built into each channel.

Several influential albums were mixed on the console, including The Beatles' Abbey Road and Pink Floyd's The Dark Side of the Moon.

Hardware recreations and software emulations
In 2011, Chandler Limited released the Curve Bender, a rackmount recreation of the TG12345's EQ section.  In 2014, Waves Audio released a plug-in that emulates two channels of the TG12345.

References

Mixing consoles
EMI